Demolition 23 (stylized Demolition 23.) was a rock band formed in 1993 in New York by former Hanoi Rocks frontman Michael Monroe and ex-Star Star guitarist Jay Hening following the ending of Monroe's Jerusalem Slim project with Steve Stevens.

Initially, Demolition 23. was a cover band, playing live shows in New York, with Monroe and Hening joined by the accomplished session drummer Jimmy Clark. Their shows were notable for guest appearances by music industry friends such as Sebastian Bach and Kory Clarke.

Demolition 23.'s eponymous first album, Demolition 23., was recorded at Power Station Studios in New York City and produced and largely penned by Little Steven. Monroe's former Hanoi Rocks bandmate Sami Yaffa played bass guitar on the album, and the music was a return to Monroe and Yaffa's punk roots with tracks such as "Same Shit Different Day", "Hammersmith Palais" and covers of songs by Johnny Thunders, UK Subs and The Dead Boys. The album was dedicated to the memory of Stiv Bators and released on the Music for Nations label in 1994.

In March 1995, Nasty Suicide announced his departure from the band much to the surprise of Michael Monroe who then decided to end the band.

On October 14, 2022, the album was reissued on Bandcamp with three bonus tracks: demos of "Hammersmith Palais", "Dysfunctional", and "The Scum Lives On".

Discography

Albums 
Demolition 23. (1994) – Music for Nations CDMFN 176

References

External links 
 Demolition 23. on Little Steven's official website
 Demolition 23 on Bandcamp

Hanoi Rocks
Punk rock groups from New York (state)
Finnish punk rock groups